Brain Tumour Research is a UK-based medical research charity dedicated to funding research, raising awareness of brain tumours. The charities vision is to find a cure for brain tumours of all kinds.

The charity works with, and funds a network of experts in sustainable research at dedicated Centres of Excellence across the UK. The charity also focuses on influencing the Government and larger cancer charities to invest more nationally.

History 
In 2004, an informal partnership of several regional UK charities working to raise funds for brain tumour research and support agreed to join forces under the banner of the United Brain Tumour Campaign, committing themselves to work together to increase awareness across the UK and achieve a common goal to raise funds specifically for research in the UK into the prevention and treatment of brain tumours.

The Diana Ford Trust, a charity funding brain tumour research, re-registered as Brain Tumour Research in 2008, using their cash deposits to fund first stage of a new national brain tumour research funding and awareness campaign. Brain Tumour Research was launched as a national charity in 2009.

Brain Tumour Research also acts as an umbrella organisation for a number of brain tumour charities throughout the UK.

Research Centres of Excellence 
Brain Tumour Research is the only national brain tumour charity in the UK funding sustainable and continuous research into brain tumours at UK Centres of Excellence, in partnership with leading Universities and Healthcare bodies. These research centres are established through a rigorous and transparent application process including comprehensive international peer-review process.

University of Portsmouth 
Brain Tumour Research’s inaugural Centre is led by Professor Geoff Pilkington, a world renowned expert in Neuro-oncology. His team of specialist researchers within the Cellular and Molecular Neuro-Oncology Group are made up of a principal esearch fellow, research fellows, senior research associates and PhD students. Their team is strengthened with MSc and Erasmus students. They comprise the largest team of laboratory-based brain tumour research experts in the UK.

Research at the University of Portsmouth is also supported by funds being brought in by other charities, including Ali's Dream, Charlie's Challenge, Anna's Hope, Headcase, the Ollie Young Foundation, the Dr Hadwen Trust, and Children with Cancer.

Queen Mary University of London 
Professor Silvia Marino, one of the UK’s leading neuropathologists, leads the Queen Mary University of London research team (in collaboration with UCL Institute of Neurology).
Their research focuses on glioblastoma multiforme (GBM), the most common and most aggressive type of brain tumour found in humans. The researchers aim to increase understanding of the brain cells from which GBMs originate: how this tumour type develops from normal cells, and which genes and biological functions control its behaviour. By uncovering this knowledge, the clinical evaluation of each individual patient can be improved and specific drugs which target the tumour cells can be identified.

Imperial College Healthcare NHS Trust 
Led by Mr Kevin O’Neill, a consultant neurosurgeon at Imperial College Healthcare NHS Trust, a team of world-class researchers are investigating the biology of tumour metabolisms to further understand the behaviour of this disease.

Plymouth University 
Led by Professor Oliver Hanemann, the Plymouth University centre conducts research into low-grade brain tumours occurring in teenagers and adults. By identifying and understanding the mechanism that makes a cell become cancerous, the team explore ways in which to halt or reverse that mechanism.

Campaigning 
John Bercow, MP for Buckingham, Speaker of the  House of Commons and Brain Tumour Research Patron established the first all-party parliamentary group (APPG) for brain tumours in July 2005.

The APPG is invaluable in promoting important messages about research to parliamentarians, raising awareness of brain tumours and influencing the national spend for research into this disease.

Members of the group attend parliamentary awareness raising events and meet three times a year to discuss relevant topics, and raise issues in the House of Commons through:
 Parliamentary Questions
 Debates
 Early Day Motions
The group consists of MPs representing different political parties and the House of Lords.

The elected officers of the group (July 2017) are:
 Derek Thomas MP - Chair
 Rt. Hon Alistair Carmichael MP - Vice Chair
 Lord Carlile of Berriew - Vice Chair
 Kevin Brennan MP - Vice Chair
Previous elected officers of the group include:
 Rebecca Harris MP - Chair
 Mark Durkan MP - Vice Chair
 Caroline Ansell MP - Honorary Secretary
Brain Tumour Research provides the secretariat for the Group.

See also 
 Cancer in the United Kingdom

References

Cancer organisations based in the United Kingdom
Health charities in the United Kingdom
Health in Buckinghamshire
Organisations based in Milton Keynes
Research in the United Kingdom